Coventry was a borough constituency  which was represented in the House of Commons of England and its successors, the House of Commons of Great Britain and the House of Commons of the United Kingdom.

Centred on the City of Coventry in Warwickshire, it returned two Members of Parliament (MPs) from 1295 until the Redistribution of Seats Act 1885, when its representation was reduced to one.  The Coventry constituency was abolished for the 1945 general election, when it was split into two new constituencies: Coventry East and Coventry West.

Elections were held using the bloc vote system when electing two MPs (until 1885), and then first-past-the-post to elect one MP thereafter.

Boundaries

1832–1868: The City of Coventry and the suburbs thereof.

1868–1918: The existing parliamentary borough and the Parish of Stoke.

The constituency was unchanged by the Representation of the People Act 1884. By the time its boundaries were revised in 1918, it was defined as consisting of the city of Coventry, the parishes of St. Michael Without and Holy Trinity Without, the parish of Stoke, and part of the parish of Wyken.

1918–1945: The county borough of Coventry.

History

In the eighteenth century Coventry was, despite its size, known as a corrupt borough.

Members of Parliament

MPs before 1660

MPs 1660–1885

MPs 1885–1945

Election results

Elections in the 1830s

 
 

 
 
 

Ellice was appointed Secretary at War, requiring a by-election.

Elections in the 1840s

Elections in the 1850s
Turner resigned after being appointed Vice-Chancellor of the High Court, causing a by-election.

 

Geach's death caused a by-election.

 Phillimore retired from the contest two hours into polling.

Elections in the 1860s
Ellice's death caused a by-election.

 

Paxton's death caused a by-election.

 

  

Treherne's death caused a by-election.

  

The by-election was declared void on petition due to bribery by Jackson's agent.

Elections in the 1870s

Elections in the 1880s

Jackson resigned after being appointed a judge on the Queen's Bench Division of the High Court of Justice, causing a by-election.

Eaton was elevated to the peerage, becoming Lord Cheylesmore, causing a by-election.

Elections in the 1890s

Elections in the 1900s

Elections in the 1910s

Mason had opposed the war and was replaced as Liberal candidate by Mansel who supported the Coalition Government. Bannington was the candidate of the National Federation of Discharged and Demobilized Sailors and Soldiers.

Elections in the 1920s

Elections in the 1930s

References & Notes

References
Robert Beatson, A Chronological Register of Both Houses of Parliament (London: Longman, Hurst, Res & Orme, 1807) 
 
 F W S Craig, "British Parliamentary Election Results 1832-1885" (2nd edition, Aldershot: Parliamentary Research Services, 1989)
 Lewis Namier & John Brooke, The History of Parliament: The House of Commons 1754-1790 (London: HMSO, 1964)
 "The Constitutional Yearbook, 1913" (London: National Unionist Association, 1913)

Parliamentary constituencies in Coventry
Parliamentary constituencies in Warwickshire (historic)
Constituencies of the Parliament of the United Kingdom established in 1298
1470 establishments in England
Constituencies of the Parliament of the United Kingdom disestablished in 1945
Parliamentary constituencies in the West Midlands (county) (historic)